Michael Clayton is a 2007 American legal thriller film written and directed by Tony Gilroy in his feature directorial debut and starring George Clooney, Tom Wilkinson, Tilda Swinton, and Sydney Pollack. Clooney plays lawyer Michael Clayton, who discovers a coverup over the effects of toxic agrochemicals.

Released on October 5, 2007, the film grossed $93 million worldwide. It was praised for its direction, performances, and screenplay; Swinton's performance was particularly lauded. Michael Clayton was nominated for seven Academy Awards: Best Picture, Best Director, Best Original Score, Best Original Screenplay, Best Actor for Clooney, Best Supporting Actor for Wilkinson, and Best Supporting Actress for Swinton, which she won.

Plot
Michael Clayton is a "fixer" for a prestigious New York City law firm, using his connections and knowledge of legal loopholes for clients' benefit. One night, Michael leaves a poker game to attend to a client who has been involved in a hit-and-run crash. Driving home, he sees three horses in a field. He stops, gets out of his car and approaches them. Behind him, a bomb detonates in his car.

Four days earlier, a loan shark gives Michael a week to raise $75,000 after a failed investment in a restaurant he made with his brother Timmy. He asks his boss, Marty Bach, for a loan to cover the expenses; Marty insinuates that the firm will be finished if Michael does not get Arthur Edens, one of the firm's leading attorneys, under control. Arthur has a manic episode in the middle of a deposition in Milwaukee. The deposition involves a multi-billion-dollar six-year class action lawsuit against U-North, an agricultural products conglomerate Arthur's firm is representing. Michael arrives in Milwaukee and bails Arthur out of jail after learning he is no longer taking his medication, but Arthur escapes from their hotel room during the night and returns to New York.

Karen Crowder, U-North's general counsel, discovers that Arthur has a confidential U-North memo proving the company knew its weed killer was carcinogenic, which led to 468 deaths. She brings this to the attention of U-North CEO Don Jeffries, whose signature is on the memo. Don puts her in contact with two hitmen; she has them follow Arthur and bug his apartment and phone.

Michael finds Arthur on a Manhattan street and confronts him about calls he made to Anna Kaiserson, one of the plaintiffs in the lawsuit. Arthur realizes his calls are being monitored. He calls his own voicemail at the firm and says he will go public with the memo. Karen authorizes the hitmen to take "drastic measures". They break into Arthur's apartment, kill him, and make it look like suicide.

After learning of Arthur's death, Michael becomes suspicious when he discovers that U-North was planning a settlement just a few days before, and that Arthur had booked a flight to New York for Anna. He finds Anna and learns that no one knew of her conversations with Arthur, yet Michael's firm knew of Arthur's conversations with the U-North plaintiffs. With help from his brother Gene, a police officer, he breaks into Arthur's sealed apartment. He finds champagne and two glasses in the refrigerator, a copy of a fantasy novel beloved by Michael's son Henry, with several pages highlighted and annotated by Arthur, and a receipt from a photocopy shop.

The hitmen, who have been trailing Michael, call the police as he enters the apartment. He is caught and arrested for trespassing, but Gene bails him out. Using the receipt, Michael discovers that Arthur ordered 2,000 copies of the confidential U-North memo. The hitmen also obtain a copy, which they give Karen. Believing Michael is blackmailing the firm, Marty offers him a renewed contract and the $80,000 he had requested on the condition he sign a non-disclosure agreement. Michael realizes that Marty and Barry Grissom, another attorney at the firm, know about U-North's cover-up. After paying Timmy's debt, he goes to play poker.

The hitmen rig Michael's car with a bomb while Michael plays poker. Driving past a field, he sees some horses and leaves his car to approach them. While he is in the field, the bomb detonates. Michael escapes into the woods. At a U-North board meeting, Karen proposes that the board approve a new settlement in the lawsuit. Michael confronts her in the foyer and goads her into offering him $10 million for his silence. Karen reluctantly agrees; Michael reveals that he is wearing a wire, with Gene and other NYPD detectives listening. As Karen and Don are arrested, Michael gets into a cab and rides away.

Cast
 George Clooney as Michael Clayton, attorney at Kenner, Bach, and Ledeen
 Tom Wilkinson as Arthur Edens, attorney at Kenner, Bach, and Ledeen
 Tilda Swinton as Karen Crowder, counsel at U-North
 Sydney Pollack as Marty Bach, managing partner at Kenner, Bach, and Ledeen
 Michael O'Keefe as Barry Grissom, attorney at Kenner, Bach, and Ledeen
 Sean Cullen as Gene Clayton, Michael's brother, a police detective
 Ken Howard as Don Jeffries, U-North's CEO
 Merritt Wever as Anna, one of the plaintiffs against U-North
 Austin Williams as Henry Clayton, Michael's young son
 Denis O'Hare as Mr. Greer
 Julie White as Mrs. Greer
 Bill Raymond as Gabe Zabel
 Robert Prescott as Verne, a hit man
 Terry Serpico as Iker, another hit man

Release

Theatrical
Principal photography took place from January 30 to April 7, 2006. The film premiered on August 31, 2007, at the Venice Film Festival. It was shown at the American Films Festival of Deauville on September 2, 2007, and at the Toronto International Film Festival on September 7. It opened in the United Kingdom on September 28, and at the Dubai Film Festival in December. It opened in limited release in the United States on October 5, 2007, and in wide release in the US on October 12. It grossed $10.3 million in the opening week. It was rereleased on January 25, 2008. It has grossed $49 million in North America and $92.9 million worldwide.

Home media
The film was released on DVD and Blu-ray Disc on February 19, 2008. The DVD contains deleted scenes and a commentary by writer/director Tony Gilroy. On March 11, 2008, the movie was also released on HD DVD.

Critical reception
On review aggregator Rotten Tomatoes, the film holds an approval rating of 91% based on 205 reviews, with an average rating of 7.60/10. The website's critical consensus reads: "Michael Clayton is one of the most sharply scripted films of 2007, with an engrossing premise and faultless acting. Director Tony Gilroy succeeds not only in capturing the audience's attention, but holding it until the credits roll." Metacritic assigned the film a weighted average score of 82 out of 100, based on 36 critics indicating "universal acclaim". Audiences surveyed by CinemaScore gave the film a B on an A+ to F scale.

Owen Gleiberman of Entertainment Weekly gave it an A, saying that it was "better than good, it just about restores your faith". Roger Ebert gave it a full four stars and Richard Roeper named it the best film of the year. It was also Richard Schickel's top film of 2007, and he called it "a morally alert, persuasively realistic and increasingly suspenseful melodrama, impeccably acted and handsomely staged by Tony Gilroy". Time wrote, "Michael Clayton is not an exercise in high-tension energy; you'll never confuse its eponymous protagonist with Jason Bourne. But it does have enough of a melodramatic pulse to keep you engaged in its story and, better than that, it is full of plausible characters who are capable of surprising—and surpassing—your expectations". Stanley Kauffmann of The New Republic wrote that "Gilroy's film is distinguished beyond its components by its purpose, its compassion, its interest—increasingly manifest—in the soul".

Michael Clayton appeared on many critics' top ten lists of the best films of 2007.

Accolades

Soundtrack

Original Motion Picture Soundtrack: Michael Clayton was composed by James Newton Howard and released on September 25, 2007, on the Varèse Sarabande label. It was nominated for an Academy Award for Best Original Score.

Notes and references

External links

 
 
 
 
 
 
 Michael Clayton at Soundtrack Collector

2007 films
2000s legal films
2000s thriller films
American legal films
American legal drama films
American drama films
American nonlinear narrative films
BAFTA winners (films)
Films about bipolar disorder
Castle Rock Entertainment films
Edgar Award-winning works
Films featuring a Best Supporting Actress Academy Award-winning performance
Films set in New York (state)
Films set in Milwaukee
Summit Entertainment films
Warner Bros. films
Films shot in New York (state)
Films scored by James Newton Howard
Legal thriller films
Films directed by Tony Gilroy
Films produced by Sydney Pollack
Films with screenplays by Tony Gilroy
2007 directorial debut films
2000s English-language films
2000s American films